Sebeos was a 7th-century Armenian bishop and historian.

Little is known about the author, though a signature on the resolution of the Ecclesiastical Council of Dvin in 645 reads 'Bishop Sebeos of Bagratunis.' His writings are valuable as one of the few intact surviving sources that chronicle 6th-century Armenia and its surrounding territories. The history of Sebeos contains detailed descriptions from the period of Sassanid supremacy in Armenia up to the Islamic conquest in 661. His history was published for the first time in 1851 in Istanbul.

Writings
A History of Heraclius, chronicling events from the end of the 5th century to 661, has been attributed to him. The first section begins with the mythical foundation of Armenia with the Legend of Hyke and Bel, moving to contemporary history with the ascent of Vardan II Mamikonian in 570. From there, he relates the struggles and alliances between Persia and Byzantium.

The second section narrates the ascent of a new political and military force, the Ishmaelites (i.e. Arabs) in year 622 CE. 

This section describes how Muhammad first established a community comprising Ishmaelites and Jews based on their common descent from Abraham; the Arabs via Ishmael, and the Jews via Isaac. From there, the Ishmaelites made dramatic territorial gains, including their victory over the Sassanian dynasty, and the narrative goes in to the division of the Ishmaelite armies and the beginnings of the First Fitna. He relates these developments to Armenia. He stops with the end of first fitna, as Muawiyah I makes peace with all.

References

Literature 
 The Armenian History attributed to Sebeos, translated, with Notes, by R. W. Thomson, historical Commentary by J. Howard-Johnston, Assistance from T. Greenwood (Translated Texts for Historians), 2 Volumes, Liverpool 1999.
 T. Greenwood, "Sasanian Echoes and Apocalyptic Expectations: A Re-Evaluation of the Armenian History attributed to Sebeos", Le Muséon 115, Fasc. 1—2 (2002) 323—397.

External links
 Sebeos' History
 Translator's Preface
 English translation of the History - mirror if main site unavailable
 Sebeos' History, Russian translation, S.Petersburg 1862.
 Encyclopedia Iranica's Article on Sebeos

7th-century Armenian historians
7th-century bishops
Heraclius